Karen Lynne Oberdiear (often credited professionally with surname misspelled as Karen Obediear) (September 6, 1962 - March 21, 2009) was an American actress and former child star.

Career 
Her first role was in an episode of Sierra in 1974.

Shortly after, she appeared as Boo Wheeler in The Texas Wheelers on ABC television starting on September 13, 1974.

She also appeared in Fawn Story, an episode of the ABC Afterschool Special, and shows such as Gunsmoke, Medical Center, Rafferty, and Hello, Larry.

Her film roles were in Sybil (1976) and A Force of One (1979).

Personal life 
Oberdiear was born September 6, 1962, grew up in the Westchester region of Los Angeles, and attended Westchester High School. After ending her acting career she worked as a self-employed accountant.

Death 
Oberdiear was killed in a Piper Cherokee plane crash on March 21, 2009. She had been the only passenger. The pilot, William Morgan, also died.

Filmography

References

External links 
 

1962 births
2009 deaths
American child actresses
American television actresses
American film actresses
20th-century American actresses
21st-century American women